Vijaypal Singh Tomar is an Indian politician and Member of Parliament in Rajya Sabha from Uttar Pradesh. He was former president of the BJP Kisan Morcha.

References

Living people
Rajya Sabha members from Uttar Pradesh
Politicians from Meerut
Bharatiya Janata Party politicians from Uttar Pradesh
Year of birth missing (living people)